God's Good Man is a 1919 British silent drama film directed by Maurice Elvey and starring Basil Gill, Peggy Carlisle and Barry Bernard. It was based on a 1904 novel by Marie Corelli. Its plot involves an heiress who marries a much poorer man.

Cast
 Basil Gill as Reverend John Walden
 Peggy Carlisle as Maryilla Vancourt
 Barry Bernard as Julien Adderley
 Hugh Dabernon-Stoke as Oliver Leach
 Teddy Arundell as Bainton
 Julian Henry as Lord Roxmouth
 Temple Bell as Cicely Bourne
 Kate Gurney as Mrs. Spice

References

External links

1919 films
British silent feature films
1919 drama films
1910s English-language films
Films directed by Maurice Elvey
Films based on British novels
Films based on works by Marie Corelli
British drama films
British black-and-white films
1910s British films
Silent drama films